Ehnahre is an American experimental extreme metal ensemble and contemporary composition collective, based in Boston, Massachusetts, United States. Their music incorporates elements of Contemporary classical music, Aleatoric music, Doom metal, and Death metal, and utilizes extended techniques, aleatoric rhythms, aspects of Serialism, and elements from free improvisation, contemporary chamber music, and extreme metal styles.

According to critic and composer Matthew Guerrieri, Ehnahre's music, "fueled by dissonance, constantly slips free of such genre expectations", "[unfolding] in heavy, slow-moving clouds of sound". Although their compositions are fixed, usually in conventional notation, their dense rhythms, harmonies, and avoidance of repetition often draw comparisons from Free jazz and Free improvisation. They do not write their own lyrics, choosing instead to set texts by great modernist poets.

Discography

Studio albums
The Man Closing Up (2008) 
Taming the Cannibals (2010)
Old Earth (2012)
Douve (2015)
The Marrow (2017)

EPs
Alpha/Omega (2010)
Nothing and Nothingness (2016)

Live albums
Pipeline (2009)

Demos
Negative Reasoning (2001)

References

External links
 Ehnahre official Bandcamp.com page
 Ehnahre official Facebook page
 Ehnahre at metal-archives.com

Extreme metal musical groups